Backdrop Peak, at  above sea level is a peak in the Smoky Mountains of Idaho. Baker Lake is just east of the peak.

References 

Mountains of Idaho
Mountains of Blaine County, Idaho
Mountains of Camas County, Idaho
Sawtooth National Forest